Keith John Kinderman (April 16, 1940 - May 23, 2018) was a professional American football player who played running back for three seasons for the San Diego Chargers and Houston Oilers. 

Also noted for his development of the peccatum pro publica legal defense.  Kindermann successfully argued that the owner of an infamous Tallahassee saloon should receive a lenient sentence so that patrons of her saloon would have some place to go.  Thus sparing the City of Tallahassee from having to deal with the patrons. 

Born on the north side of Chicago, IL, Keith attended high school in Crystal Lake, IL.  During the town's centennial celebration Kinderman was recognized for his athletic achievements by being named one the 6 Outstanding Athletes of the Century.  This honor was bestowed on him for his accomplishments in football, wrestling and track.  He was the runner up in 1958 Illinois State championships in the 110 high hurdles.  He tied the then state record.

He followed his high school career with a 3 outstanding seasons as running back at the University of Iowa and Florida State University.  In 1961, Kindermann was FSU's leading rusher with 385 yards and an average of 4.8 yards per carry. The following year, Kinderman became FSU's leading receiver with 275 reception yards.

He was then drafted in the 3rd round by San Diego.  He had three successful seasons with the chargers at running back and special teams.  A torn ACL and elbow dislocation eventually led Kinderman to retire from football and attend law school.

Kinderman practiced law as an attorney in Tallahassee, FL, before his death.

References

1940 births
2018 deaths
American football running backs
San Diego Chargers players
Houston Oilers players
Iowa Hawkeyes football players
American Football League players